The Following is a list of flags and banners used in Uganda.

National flag

Government flag

Ethnic group flags

Political flags

Military flags

Subdivision flags

Traditional kingdoms

Historical flags

Historical flags

Kingdom of Buganda

Belgian Empire

British Empire

See also 

 Flag of Uganda
 Coat of arms of Uganda

References 

Ugandan
Flags